On April 15, Jackie Robinson was the opening day first baseman for the Brooklyn Dodgers, becoming the first black player in Major League Baseball. Robinson went on to bat .297, score 125 runs, steal 29 bases and win Major League Baseball's inaugural Rookie of the Year award. The Dodgers won the National League title and went on to lose to the New York Yankees in the 1947 World Series. This season was dramatized in the movie 42.

Offseason 
 October 2, 1946: Steve Nagy was purchased from the Dodgers by the Pittsburgh Pirates.
 October 19, 1946: Art Herring was purchased from the Dodgers by the Pittsburgh Pirates.
 December 4, 1946: Augie Galan was traded by the Dodgers to the Cincinnati Reds for Ed Heusser.
 December 5, 1946: Eddie Basinski was traded by the Dodgers to the Pittsburgh Pirates for Al Gerheauser.
 Prior to 1947 season: Marion Fricano was signed as an amateur free agent by the Dodgers.

Regular season 
Due to the suspension of Leo Durocher for a year for "conduct detrimental to baseball", coach Clyde Sukeforth managed the first 2 games of the season on an emergency basis, but declined to manage for the full season, so Burt Shotton took over as manager for the rest of the season.

The Dodgers had a home attendance of 1.8 million paying fans, a National League record at the time. On the road, the Dodgers drew 1.9 million paying fans, also a National League record at that time.

Season standings

Record vs. opponents

Game log 

|- bgcolor=#bfb
| 1 || April 15 || Braves || 5–3 || Gregg (1-0) || Sain (0-1) || Casey (1) || 26,623 || 1-0
|- bgcolor=#bfb
| 2 || April 17 || Braves || 12–6 || Higbe (1-0) || Cooper (0-1) || Casey (2) || 10,252 || 2-0
|- bgcolor=#fbb
| 3 || April 18 || @ Giants || 4–10 || Koslo (1-0) || Lombardi (0-1) || || 37,546 || 2-1
|- bgcolor=#fbb
| 4 || April 19 || @ Giants || 3–4 || Voiselle (1-1) || Branca (0-1) || || 52,355 || 2-2
|- bgcolor=#bfb
| 5 || April 22 || Phillies || 1–0 || Gregg (2-0) || Leonard (1-1) || || 9,790 || 3-2
|- bgcolor=#bfb
| 6 || April 23 || Phillies || 5–2 || Hatten (1-0) || Judd (0-2) || || 8,812 || 4-2
|- bgcolor=#bfb
| 7 || April 24 || Phillies || 2–0 || Branca (1-1) || Hughes (0-2) || Casey (3) || 11,654 || 5-2
|- bgcolor=#bfb
| 8 || April 26 || Giants || 7–3 || Lombardi (1-1) || Voiselle (1-2) || || 33,565 || 6-2
|- bgcolor=#bfb
| 9 || April 27 || Giants || 9–8 || Casey (1-0) || Thompson (0-1) || || 31,675 || 7-2
|- bgcolor=#bfb
| 10 || April 29 || Cubs || 10–6 || Hatten (2-0) || Wyse (1-2) || Casey (4) || 22,030 || 8-2
|- bgcolor=#fbb
| 11 || April 30 || Cubs || 1–3 || Lade (1-0) || Branca (1-2) || || 20,140 || 8-3

|- bgcolor=#bfb
| 12 || May 1 || Cubs || 5–2 || Higbe (2-0) || Chipman (2-1) || Chandler (1) || 11,533 || 9-3
|- bgcolor=#bfb
| 13 || May 6 || Cardinals || 7–6 || Casey (2-0) || Grodzicki (0-1) || || 18,971 || 10-3
|- bgcolor=#fbb
| 14 || May 7 || Cardinals || 1–2 || Pollet (1-3) || Lombardi (1-2) || || 11,435 || 10-4
|- bgcolor=#fbb
| 15 || May 8 || Cardinals || 1–5 || Brecheen (3-1) || Branca (1-3) || || 32,328 || 10-5
|- bgcolor=#fbb
| 16 || May 9 || @ Phillies || 5–6 (11) || Leonard (4-1) || Casey (2-1) || || 22,680 || 10-6
|- bgcolor=#bfb
| 17 || May 10 || @ Phillies || 4–2 || Hatten (3-0) || Hughes (0-5) || || 15,556 || 11-6
|- bgcolor=#fbb
| 18 || May 11 || @ Phillies || 3–7 || Leonard (5-1) || Lombardi (1-3) || || -- || 11-7
|- bgcolor=#fbb
| 19 || May 11 || @ Phillies || 4–5 || Rowe (5-0) || Chandler (0-1) || Heintzelman (1) || 40,952 || 11-8
|- bgcolor=#bfb
| 20 || May 12 || Braves || 8–3 || Branca (2-3) || Cooper (1-3) || || 19,661 || 12-8
|- bgcolor=#fbb
| 21 || May 13 || @ Reds || 5–7 || Vander Meer (1-1) || Taylor (0-1) || Gumbert (2) || 27,164 || 12-9
|- bgcolor=#fbb
| 22 || May 14 || @ Reds || 0–2 || Blackwell (4-2) || Hatten (3-1) || || 6,688 || 12-10
|- bgcolor=#fbb
| 23 || May 15 || @ Pirates || 3–7 || Bahr (3-1) || Lombardi (1-4) || Bonham (2) || 13,471 || 12-11
|- bgcolor=#bfb
| 24 || May 16 || @ Pirates || 3–1 || Branca (3-3) || Higbe (2-2) || Casey (5) || 34,184 || 13-11
|- bgcolor=#fbb
| 25 || May 17 || @ Pirates || 0–4 || Ostermueller (3-1) || Melton (0-1) || || 17,673 || 13-12
|- bgcolor=#bfb
| 26 || May 18 || @ Cubs || 4–2 || Hatten (4-1) || Schmitz (3-3) || Casey (6) || 46,572 || 14-12
|- bgcolor=#fbb
| 27 || May 19 || @ Cubs || 7–8 || Erickson (1-1) || Gregg (2-1) || Schmitz (3) || 21,875 || 14-13
|- bgcolor=#bfb
| 28 || May 21 || @ Cardinals || 4–3 (10) || Casey (3-1) || Brecheen (4-2) || || 16,249 || 15-13
|- bgcolor=#bfb
| 29 || May 23 || Phillies || 5–4 || Barney (1-0) || Leonard (6-2) || Casey (7) || 33,136 || 16-13
|- bgcolor=#fbb
| 30 || May 24 || Phillies || 3–4 (10) || Schmidt (1-2) || Casey (3-2) || || 23,442 || 16-14
|- bgcolor=#bfb
| 31 || May 25 || Phillies || 5–3 || Hatten (5-1) || Hughes (0-6) || || 18,016 || 17-14
|- bgcolor=#bfb
| 32 || May 27 || @ Giants || 7–3 || Branca (4-3) || Koslo (3-2) || || 51,780 || 18-14
|- bgcolor=#bfb
| 33 || May 28 || @ Giants || 14–2 || Taylor (1-1) || Jansen (3-1) || || 28,260 || 19-14
|- bgcolor=#fbb
| 34 || May 29 || @ Giants || 4–5 || Hartung (4-0) || Hatten (5-2) || Trinkle (4) || 24,274 || 19-15
|- bgcolor=#fbb
| 35 || May 30 || @ Braves || 3–6 || Spahn (8-0) || Barney (1-1) || || -- || 19-16
|- bgcolor=#fbb
| 36 || May 30 || @ Braves || 0–3 || Barrett (2-3 || Lombardi (1-5) || || 30,535 || 19-17
|- bgcolor=#bfb
| 37 || May 31 || @ Braves || 5–0 || Branca (5-3) || Lanfranconi (0-1) || || 23,275 || 20-17

|- bgcolor=#bfb
| 38 || June 1 || Cardinals || 6–1 || Taylor (2-1) || Brecheen (5-3) || || 34,109 || 21-17
|- bgcolor=#fbb
| 39 || June 2 || Cardinals || 4–5 (10) || Pollet (3-6) || Branca (5-4) || || 17,719 || 21-18
|- bgcolor=#bfb
| 40 || June 3 || Pirates || 11–6 || Barney (2-1) || Higbe (3-5) || Casey (8) || -- || 22-18
|- bgcolor=#bfb
| 41 || June 3 || Pirates || 8–7 || Barney (3-1) || Roe (2-3) || || 27,244 || 23-18
|- bgcolor=#bfb
| 42 || June 4 || Pirates || 9–4 || Branca (6-4) || Singleton (1-1) || || 32,287 || 24-18
|- bgcolor=#bfb
| 43 || June 5 || Pirates || 3–0 || Taylor (3-1) || Ostermueller (4-2) || || 24,977 || 25-18
|- bgcolor=#bfb
| 44 || June 6 || Cubs || 6–2 || Hatten (6-2) || Wyse (2-5) || || 31,555 || 26-18
|- bgcolor=#fbb
| 45 || June 9 || Reds || 6–9 || Gumbert (5-2) || Lombardi (1-6) || Peterson (1) || 32,864 || 26-19
|- bgcolor=#fbb
| 46 || June 10 || Reds || 1–3 || Blackwell (8-2) || Branca (6-5) || || -- || 26-20
|- bgcolor=#bfb
| 47 || June 10 || Reds || 6–5 || Branca (7-5) || Lively (0-2) || || 33,045 || 27-20
|- bgcolor=#fbb
| 48 || June 11 || Reds || 4–5 || Riddle (1-0) || Hatten (6-3) || Gumbert (4) || 18,403 || 27-21
|- bgcolor=#fbb
| 49 || June 13 || @ Cardinals || 0–3 || Munger (5-1) || Taylor (3-2) ||  || 25,606 || 27-22
|- bgcolor=#fbb
| 50 || June 14 || @ Cardinals || 3–5 || Brazle (5-3) || Branca (7-6) ||  || 9,190 || 27-23
|- bgcolor=#fbb
| 51 || June 14 || @ Cardinals || 2–12 || Brecheen (8-3) || Barney (3-2) || || 26,005 || 27-24
|- bgcolor=#fbb
| 52 || June 15 || @ Cardinals || 3–11 || Pollet (4-7) || Hatten (6-4) || || 29,686 || 27-25
|- bgcolor=#bfb
| 53 || June 16 || @ Cubs || 2–1 || Taylor (4-2) || Lade (4-3) || || 20,097 || 28-25
|- bgcolor=#bfb
| 54 || June 18 || @ Cubs || 5–3 || Hatten (7-4) || Borowy (7-3) || Casey (9) || 23,313 || 29-25
|- bgcolor=#bfb
| 55 || June 19 || @ Cubs || 5–1 || Branca (8-6) || Schmitz (4-8) || || 19,932 || 30-25
|- bgcolor=#bfb
| 56 || June 21 || @ Reds || 6–5 || Casey (4-2) || Gumbert (5-3) || || 11,807 || 31-25
|- bgcolor=#fbb
| 57 || June 22 || @ Reds || 0–4 || Blackwell (11-2) || Hatten (7-5) || || -- || 31-26
|- bgcolor=#bfb
| 58 || June 22 || @ Reds || 9–8 || Lombardi (2-6) || Walters (3-4) || Gregg (1) || 31,204 || 32-26
|- bgcolor=#bfb
| 59 || June 24 || @ Pirates || 4–2 || Branca (9-6) || Ostermueller (5-4) || || 35,331 || 33-26
|- bgcolor=#bfb
| 60 || June 25 || @ Pirates || 6–2 || Taylor (5-2) || Higbe (4-7) || || 10,313 || 34-26
|- bgcolor=#bfb
| 61 || June 26 || Braves || 8–6 || Branca (10-6) || Johnson (2-4) || || 33,102 || 35-26
|- bgcolor=#bfb
| 62 || June 27 || @ Braves || 8–5 || Barney (4-2) || Voiselle (1-5) || Behrman (1) || 35,801 || 36-26
|- bgcolor=#fbb
| 63 || June 28 || @ Braves || 4–5 || Lanfranconi (1-1) || Behrman (0-3) || || 11,930 || 36-27
|- bgcolor=#bfb
| 64 || June 29 || @ Giants || 4–3 || Taylor (6-2) || Iott (1-1) || || -- || 37-27
|- bgcolor=#fbb
| 65 || June 29 || @ Giants || 5–9 || Trinkle (5-1) || Gregg (2-2) || || 52,147 || 37-28
|- bgcolor=#bfb
| 66 || June 30 || @ Phillies || 7–4 || Barney (5-2) || Rowe (8-3) || Behrman (2) || 28,515 || 38-28

|- bgcolor=#fbb
| 67 || July 1 || @ Phillies || 3–5 || Schanz (2-1) || King (0-1) || Donnelly (4) || 10,644 || 38-29
|- bgcolor=#bfb
| 68 || July 2 || Giants || 11–3 || Branca (11-6) || Kennedy (6-4) || || 33,313 || 39-29
|- bgcolor=#fbb
| 69 || July 3 || Giants || 2–19 || Koslo (8-4) || Gregg (2-3) || || 27,938 || 39-30
|- bgcolor=#bfb
| 70 || July 4 || Giants || 16–7 (8) || Casey (5-2) || Trinkle (5-2) || Branca (1) || 20,565 || 40-30
|- bgcolor=#bfb
| 71 || July 4 || Giants || 4–3 || Taylor (7-2) || M. Cooper (3-8) || || 32,332 || 41-30
|- bgcolor=#fbb
| 72 || July 5 || Braves || 1–4 || Voiselle (3-5) || Lombardi (2-7) || || 20,596 || 41-31
|- bgcolor=#bfb
| 73 || July 6 || Braves || 4–0 || Branca (12-6) || Barrett (6-6) || || 26,363 || 42-31
|- bgcolor="bbbbbb"
| – || July 8 || 14th All-Star Game || colspan=6 | American League vs. National League (Wrigley Field, Chicago)
|- bgcolor=#bfb
| 74 || July 10 || Cubs || 5–3 || Branca (13-6) || Borowy (8-4) || Casey (10) || -- || 43-31
|- bgcolor=#bfb
| 75 || July 10 || Cubs || 4–3 (10) || Branca (14-6) || Meyer (3-2) || || 35,876 || 44-31
|- bgcolor=#bfb
| 76 || July 11 || Cubs || 5–0 || Lombardi (3-7) || Passeau (0-2) || || 31,508 || 45-31
|- bgcolor=#bfb
| 77 || July 12 || Cubs || 7–2 || Hatten (8-5) || Lade (6-6) || || -- || 46-31
|- bgcolor=#bfb
| 78 || July 12 || Cubs || 6–5 || Casey (6-2) || Borowy (8-5) || || 27,736 || 47-31
|- bgcolor=#bfb
| 79 || July 13 || Reds || 9–1 || King (1-1) || Peterson (3-7) || || 23,018 || 48-31
|- bgcolor=#fbb
| 80 || July 14 || Reds || 1–9 || Lively (2-2) || Branca (14-7) || || 29,379 || 48-32
|- bgcolor=#fbb
| 81 || July 15 || Pirates || 4–12 || Roe (3-7) || Taylor (7-3) || || -- || 48-33
|- bgcolor=#fbb
| 82 || July 15 || Pirates || 3–9 || Bagby (3-3) || Hatten (8-6) || || 25,594 || 48-34
|- bgcolor=#bfb
| 83 || July 16 || Pirates || 10–6 || Behrman (1-3) || Bonham (7-3) || Taylor (1) || 27,756 || 49-34
|- bgcolor=#fbb
| 84 || July 17 || Pirates || 1–7 || Queen (1-0) || King (1-2) || || 9,133 || 49-35
|- bgcolor=#bfb
| 85 || July 18 || Cardinals || 7–0 || Branca (15-7) || Munger (8-3) || || 32,734 || 50-35
|- bgcolor=#fbb
| 86 || July 19 || Cardinals || 5–7 || Dickson (5-10) || Lombardi (3-8) || || 15,685 || 50-36
|-
| 87 || July 20 || Cardinals || 3–3 || || || || 33,420 || 50-36
|- bgcolor=#bfb
| 88 || July 21 || Reds || 7–4 || Lombardi (4-8) || Gumbert (7-6) || Behrman (3) || -- || 51-36
|- bgcolor=#bfb
| 89 || July 21 || Reds || 4–3 || Hatten (9-6) || Peterson (3-8) || || 35,092 || 52-36
|- bgcolor=#bfb
| 90 || July 22 || @ Reds || 12–1 || Branca (16-7) || Lively (2-4) || || 31,808 || 53-36
|- bgcolor=#bfb
| 91 || July 23 || @ Reds || 5–2 || Behrman (2-3) || Raffensberger (3-7) || Casey (11) || 12,528 || 54-36
|- bgcolor=#bfb
| 92 || July 24 || @ Reds || 6–1 || Lombardi (5-8) || Vander Meer (4-8) || || 13,676 || 55-36
|- bgcolor=#bfb
| 93 || July 25 || @ Pirates || 4–1 || Taylor (8-3) || Queen (1-1) || || 42,014 || 56-36
|- bgcolor=#bfb
| 94 || July 26 || @ Pirates || 6–4 || Casey (7-2) || Strincevich (1-5) || || 17,606 || 57-36
|- bgcolor=#bfb
| 95 || July 27 || @ Pirates || 8–4 || Behrman (3-3) || Ostermueller (8-6) || Casey (12) || -- || 58-36
|- bgcolor=#bfb
| 96 || July 27 || @ Pirates || 11–4 (7) || Gregg (3-3) || Higbe (7-10) || || 42,716 || 59-36
|- bgcolor=#bfb
| 97 || July 28 || @ Cubs || 4–0 || Hatten (10-6) || Schmitz (5-13) || || 25,052 || 60-36
|- bgcolor=#bfb
| 98 || July 29 || @ Cardinals || 4–0 || Taylor (9-3) || Dickson (6-11) || || 32,419 || 61-36
|- bgcolor=#bfb
| 99 || July 30 || @ Cardinals || 11–10 (10)  || King (2-2) || Hearn (7-4) || || 31,709 || 62-36
|- bgcolor=#bfb
| 100 || July 31 || @ Cardinals || 2–1 || Lombardi (6-8) || Pollet (6-9) || || 21,873 || 63-36

|- bgcolor=#fbb
| 101 || August 1 || @ Cubs || 8–10 || Kush (5-1) || Casey (7-3) || || 24,319 || 63-37
|- bgcolor=#fbb
| 102 || August 2 || @ Cubs || 7–12 || Erickson (6-4) || Taylor (9-4) || || 34,108 || 63-38
|- bgcolor=#fbb
| 103 || August 3 || @ Cubs || 0–6 || Schmitz (6-13) || Branca (16-8) || || 41,120 || 63-39
|- bgcolor=#bfb
| 104 || August 4 || @ Braves || 4–2 (10) || Casey (8-3) || Voiselle (3-11) || || 23,828 || 64-39
|- bgcolor=#fbb
| 105 || August 5 || @ Braves || 2–4 || Sain (15-7) || Gregg (3-4) || || 20,658 || 64-40
|- bgcolor=#fbb
| 106 || August 6 || @ Braves || 3–7 || Spahn (14-6) || Hatten (10-7) || || 32,252 || 64-41
|- bgcolor=#fbb
| 107 || August 7 || @ Braves || 1–3 || Barrett (9-8) || Taylor (9-5) || || 16,971 || 64-42
|- bgcolor=#bfb
| 108 || August 8 || Phillies || 5–0 || Branca (17-8) || Leonard (12-7) || || 32,170 || 65-42
|- bgcolor=#fbb
| 109 || August 9 || Phillies || 3–5 || Rowe (10-8) || Lombardi (6-9) || Jurisich (1) || 23,095 || 65-43
|- bgcolor=#bfb
| 110 || August 10 || Phillies || 2–0 || Hatten (11-7) || Donnelly (1-4) || || 24,830 || 66-43
|- bgcolor=#fbb
| 111 || August 12 || Braves || 2–9 || Voiselle (4-11) || Branca (17-9) || Shoun (1) || 38,794 || 66-44
|- bgcolor=#bfb
| 112 || August 13 || Braves || 10–5 || King (3-2) || Johnson (3-7) || || 25,684 || 67-44
|- bgcolor=#bfb
| 113 || August 14 || Braves || 1–0 || Lombardi (7-9) || Spahn (14-8) || || 18,571 || 68-44
|- bgcolor=#bfb
| 114 || August 15 || @ Phillies || 8–1 || Hatten (12-7) || Rowe (10-9) || || 26,060 || 69-44
|- bgcolor=#bfb
| 115 || August 16 || @ Phillies || 5–4 || Casey (9-3) || Judd (1-12) || Behrman (4) || 9,859 || 70-44
|- bgcolor=#fbb
| 116 || August 17 || @ Phillies || 0–4 || Leonard (14-7) || King (3-3) || || -- || 70-45
|- bgcolor=#bfb
| 117 || August 17 || @ Phillies || 7–5 || Casey (10-3) || Jurisich (1-5) || Lombardi (1) || 32,220 || 71-45
|- bgcolor=#bfb
| 118 || August 18 || Cardinals || 7–5 || Lombardi (8-9) || Pollet (7-11) || Casey (13) || 32,781 || 72-45
|- bgcolor=#bfb
| 119 || August 18 || Cardinals || 12–3 || Taylor (10-5) || Brecheen (14-7) || Lombardi (2) || 33,723 || 73-45
|- bgcolor=#fbb
| 120 || August 19 || Cardinals || 3–11 || Brazle (10-6) || Behrman (3-4) || Hearn (1) || 33,465 || 73-46
|- bgcolor=#fbb
| 121 || August 20 || Cardinals || 2–3 (12) || Pollet (8-11) || Casey (10-4) || Munger (3) || 25,762 || 73-47
|- bgcolor=#bfb
| 122 || August 21 || Reds || 8–1 || King (4-3) || Blackwell (19-6) || || 14,577 || 74-47
|- bgcolor=#bfb
| 123 || August 22 || Reds || 6–5 (12) || Behrman (4-4) || Gumbert (8-8) || || 14,836 || 75-47
|- bgcolor=#bfb
| 124 || August 23 || Reds || 8–5 || Lombardi (9-9) || Vander Meer (6-13) || || 30,041 || 76-47
|- bgcolor=#bfb
| 125 || August 24 || Pirates || 3–1 || Branca (18-9) || Bonham (9-7) || Casey (14) || 33,207 || 77-47
|- bgcolor=#bfb
| 126 || August 25 || Pirates || 11–10 || King (5-3) || Higbe (10-13) || Casey (15) || 20,166 || 78-47
|- bgcolor=#fbb
| 127 || August 26 || Pirates || 3–16 || Ostermueller (12-7) || Gregg (3-5) || || 24,069 || 78-48
|- bgcolor=#fbb
| 128 || August 27 || Cubs || 3–6 || Schmitz (9-16) || Hatten (12-8) || || 13,117 || 78-49
|- bgcolor=#bfb
| 129 || August 28 || Cubs || 6–2 || Lombardi (10-9) || Wyse (5-8) || Behrman (5) || 22,375 || 79-49
|- bgcolor=#bfb
| 130 || August 29 || Giants || 6–3 || Branca (19-9) || Koslo (14-9) || || 34,568 || 80-49
|- bgcolor=#bfb
| 131 || August 30 || Giants || 3–1 || King (6-3) || Trinkle (6-4) || Casey (16) || 37,512 || 81-49
|- bgcolor=#bfb
| 132 || August 31 || Giants || 10–4 || Behrman (5-4) || Kennedy (9-11) || Lombardi (3) || 33,837 || 82-49 

|- bgcolor=#bfb
| 133 || September 1 || Phillies || 5–0 || Hatten (13-8) || Hughes (4-10) || || 28,153 || 83-49
|- bgcolor=#fbb
| 134 || September 1 || Phillies || 0–5 || Judd (3-13) || Branca (19-10) || || 35,468 || 83-50
|- bgcolor=#bfb
| 135 || September 4 || @ Giants || 2–0 || Lombardi (11-9) || Hansen (0-4) || || 49,203 || 84-50
|- bgcolor=#bfb
| 136 || September 5 || @ Giants || 7–6 || Haugstad (1-0) || Jansen (17-5) || Casey (17) || 23,475 || 85-50
|- bgcolor=#fbb
| 137 || September 6 || @ Giants || 2–3 || Poat (3-0) || Branca (19-11) || || 43,085 || 85-51
|- bgcolor=#fbb
| 138 || September 7 || @ Giants || 6–7 || Koslo (15-9) || King (6-4) || Trinkle (9) || 50,638 || 85-52
|- bgcolor=#fbb
| 139 || September 9 || @ Cubs || 3–4 || Schmitz (10-17) || Lombardi (11-10) || Erickson (1) || 25,988 || 85-53
|- bgcolor=#bfb
| 140 || September 10 || @ Cubs || 5–1 || Hatten (14-8) || Chipman (6-5) || Casey (18) || 21,594 || 86-53
|- bgcolor=#bfb
| 141 || September 11 || @ Cardinals || 4–3 || Branca (20-11) || Brecheen (15-10) || Behrman (6) || 20,452 || 87-53
|- bgcolor=#fbb
| 142 || September 12 || @ Cardinals || 7–8 || Wilks (4-0) || Behrman (5-5) || || 31,957 || 87-54
|- bgcolor=#bfb
| 143 || September 13 || @ Cardinals || 8–7 || Lombardi (12-10) || Dickson (12-14) || Behrman (7) || 33,510 || 88-54 
|- bgcolor=#bfb
| 144 || September 14 || @ Reds || 13–2 || Hatten (15-8) || Peterson (5-13) || || -- || 89-54
|- bgcolor=#bfb
| 145 || September 14 || @ Reds || 6–3 || Hatten (16-8) || Gumbert (10-9) || || 34,623 || 90-54
|- bgcolor=#bfb
| 146 || September 16 || @ Reds || 7–3 || Branca (21-11) || Walters (8-8) || || 8,261 || 91-54
|- bgcolor=#bfb
| 147 || September 17 || @ Pirates || 4–2 || Gregg (4-5) || Ostermueller (12-9) || Behrman (8) || 33,916 || 92-54
|- bgcolor=#fbb
| 148 || September 18 || @ Pirates || 7–8 || Higbe (13-15) || King (6-5) || || 15,440 || 92-55
|- bgcolor=#fbb
| 149 || September 20 || Braves || 1–8 || Sain (20-11) || Lombardi (12-11) || || 29,762 || 92-56
|- bgcolor=#fbb
| 150 || September 21 || Braves || 0–4 || Spahn (20-10) || Branca (21-12) || || 34,128 || 92-57
|- bgcolor=#bfb
| 151 || September 23 || Giants || 6–1 || Hatten (17-8) || Jones (1-2) || Bankhead (1) || 26,123 || 93-57
|- bgcolor=#fbb
| 152 || September 24 || Giants || 5–6 || Beggs (3-5) || Ramsdell (0-1) || Trinkle (10) || 16,990 || 93-58
|- bgcolor=#bfb
| 153 || September 25 || @ Phillies || 5–2 (10) || Ramsdell (1-1) || Leonard (17-12) || || 22,736 || 94-58
|- bgcolor=#fbb
| 154 || September 27 || @ Braves || 1–2 || Martin (1-0) || Palica (0-1) || || 7,720 || 94-59
|- bgcolor=#fbb
| 155 || September 28 || @ Braves || 2–3 || Sain (21-12) || Banta (0-1) || || 25,511 || 94-60

|}

Opening Day lineup

Season chronology 
 April 15: On Opening Day, Jackie Robinson made his debut as the Dodgers' first baseman. He went 0-for-3, scoring a run. He also had one sacrifice hit and grounded into a double play before being replaced late in the game by Howie Schultz. In the field, he had 11 putouts without an error.
 April 22: In a game against the Philadelphia Phillies, Robinson committed an error for the first time in his major league career.
 May 13: Robinson played in his first game in Cincinnati. The Reds won the game 7–5. Despite the loss, Robinson had a walk, a single, and a run. Various racial slurs were hurled at Robinson by the fans. Pee Wee Reese put his hand on Robinson's shoulder to hush the crowd.
 May 18: 46,572 paying fans (while there were 20,000 fans outside) came to Chicago's Wrigley Field to see Robinson play against the Cubs. The Dodgers won by a score of 4–2.
 June 24: Against the Pirates, Robinson stole home plate for the first time in his career. The Pirates catcher was Dixie Howell, who had started the season in Brooklyn's farm system.
 September 11: St. Louis Cardinals catcher Joe Garagiola and Robinson were involved in an incident at home plate. Garagiola stepped on Robinson's foot and the two started arguing. Umpire Beans Reardon held back Garagiola while Robinson clapped. The incident was later part of a children's book titled In the Year of the Boar and Jackie Robinson by Bette Bao Lord.

Notable transactions 
 May 3, 1947: Kirby Higbe, Hank Behrman, Cal McLish, Gene Mauch and Dixie Howell were traded by the Dodgers to the Pittsburgh Pirates for Al Gionfriddo and cash.
 May 10, 1947: Howie Schultz was purchased from the Dodgers by the Philadelphia Phillies.
 May 13, 1947: Tommy Tatum was purchased from the Dodgers by the Cincinnati Reds.

Roster

Game log 

|- bgcolor=#bfb
| 1 || April 15 || Braves || 5–3 || Gregg (1-0) || Sain (0-1) || Casey (1) || 26,623 || 1-0
|-
| 2 || April 17 || Braves || 12–6 || Higbe (1-0) || Cooper (0-1) || Casey (2) || 10,252 || 2-0
|-

Season chronology 
 April 15: On Opening Day, Jackie Robinson made his debut as the Dodgers' first baseman. He went 0-for-3, scoring a run. He also had one sacrifice hit and grounded into a double play before being replaced late in the game by Howie Schultz. In the field, he had 11 putouts without an error.
 April 22: In a game against the Philadelphia Phillies, Robinson committed an error for the first time in his major league career.
 May 13: Robinson played in his first game in Cincinnati. The Reds won the game 7–5. Despite the loss, Robinson had a walk, a single, and a run. Various racial slurs were hurled at Robinson by the fans. Pee Wee Reese put his hand on Robinson's shoulder to hush the crowd.
 May 18: 46,572 paying fans (while there were 20,000 fans outside) came to Chicago's Wrigley Field to see Robinson play against the Cubs. The Dodgers won by a score of 4–2.
 June 24: Against the Pirates, Robinson stole home plate for the first time in his career. The Pirates catcher was Dixie Howell, who had started the season in Brooklyn's farm system.
 September 11: St. Louis Cardinals catcher Joe Garagiola and Robinson were involved in an incident at home plate. Garagiola stepped on Robinson's foot and the two started arguing. Umpire Beans Reardon held back Garagiola while Robinson clapped. The incident was later part of a children's book titled In the Year of the Boar and Jackie Robinson by Bette Bao Lord.

Notable transactions 
 May 3, 1947: Kirby Higbe, Hank Behrman, Cal McLish, Gene Mauch and Dixie Howell were traded by the Dodgers to the Pittsburgh Pirates for Al Gionfriddo and cash.
 May 10, 1947: Howie Schultz was purchased from the Dodgers by the Philadelphia Phillies.
 May 13, 1947: Tommy Tatum was purchased from the Dodgers by the Cincinnati Reds.

Roster

Player stats

Batting

Starters by position 
Note: Pos = Position; G = Games played; AB = At bats; H = Hits; Avg. = Batting average; HR = Home runs; RBI = Runs batted in

Other batters 
Note: G = Games played; AB = At bats; H = Hits; Avg. = Batting average; HR = Home runs; RBI = Runs batted in

Pitching

Starting pitchers 
Note: G = Games pitched; IP = Innings pitched; W = Wins; L = Losses; ERA = Earned run average; SO = Strikeouts

Other pitchers 
Note: G = Games pitched; IP = Innings pitched; W = Wins; L = Losses; ERA = Earned run average; SO = Strikeouts

Relief pitchers 
Note: G = Games pitched; W = Wins; L = Losses; SV = Saves; ERA = Earned run average; SO = Strikeouts

1947 World Series

Game 1 
September 30, 1947, at Yankee Stadium in New York City

Game 2 
October 1, 1947, at Yankee Stadium in New York City

Game 3 
October 2, 1947, at Ebbets Field in Brooklyn, New York

Game 4 
October 3, 1947, at Ebbets Field in Brooklyn, New York

Game 5 
October 4, 1947, at Ebbets Field in Brooklyn, New York

Game 6 
October 5, 1947, at Yankee Stadium in New York City

Game 7 
October 6, 1947, at Yankee Stadium in New York City

Awards and honors 
1947 Major League Baseball All-Star Game
Dixie Walker starter
Ralph Branca reserve
Bruce Edwards reserve
Pee Wee Reese reserve
Eddie Stanky reserve
Rookie of the Year Award
Jackie Robinson
TSN Major League Executive of the Year
Branch Rickey
TSN Major League All-Star Team
Ralph Branca
TSN Rookie of the Year Award
Jackie Robinson

Farm system 

LEAGUE CHAMPIONS: Mobile, Pueblo, Nashua, Spokane, Greenwood, Zanesville

Notes

References 

Baseball-Reference season page
Baseball Almanac season page

External links 
1947 Brooklyn Dodgers uniform
Brooklyn Dodgers reference site
Acme Dodgers page 
Retrosheet

 
Los Angeles Dodgers seasons
Brooklyn Dodgers season
National League champion seasons
Jackie Robinson
1947 in sports in New York City
1940s in Brooklyn
Flatbush, Brooklyn